Ervin Baldwin (born August 25, 1986) is a former American football defensive end. He has played for the Chicago Bears and Indianapolis Colts of the National Football League. He was drafted by the Bears in the seventh round of the 2008 NFL Draft. He played college football at Michigan State.

Early years 
Baldwin was selected Region Defensive Player of the Year as a senior at Macon County High School in Montezuma, Ga. He also garnered All-Middle Georgia honors in 2003.

College career 
Baldwin was an All-Big Ten selection in 2007 after starting every game (25) in his two-year Spartan career at defensive end. In 2007, he started all 13 games at DE, recording 58 tackles (27 solos) with 18.5 tackles for losses and 8.5 sacks. In 2006, he started all 12 games at the rush end and made 35 (13 solos, 22 assists) four sacks, and 6.5 tackles for losses. He was a 2005 JUCO All-American at Reedly Community College, California, and earned First-team All-California and First-team All-California Region 1 honor as a sophomore. He also was named California Region 1 and Central Valley Conference Defensive Player of the Year in 2005. He helped the Tigers win back-to-back CVC titles in 2004–05 after recording 67 tackles as a sophomore, with 27.5 tackles for losses including 14.5 sacks.

Professional career

Chicago Bears
Baldwin was a seventh-round selection (No. 208 overall) in the 2008 NFL Draft by the Chicago Bears.

Indianapolis Colts
Baldwin was signed the Colts practice squad on November 12, 2009 and promoted to the active roster on December 2, 2009.  He was released by the team on September 4, 2010.

References

External links
Chicago Bears bio
Michigan State Spartans bio
Baldwin's Forum

1986 births
Living people
People from Oglethorpe, Georgia
American football defensive ends
Michigan State Spartans football players
Chicago Bears players
Indianapolis Colts players
Chicago Rush players
Pittsburgh Power players